Turkey Branch is a  long 1st order tributary to Tussocky Branch in Sussex County, Delaware.

Course
Turkey Branch rises about 1 mile southeast of Portsville, Delaware and then flows northwest into Tussocky Branch at Portsville Pond.

Watershed
Turkey Branch drains  of area, receives about 44.7 in/year of precipitation, has a topographic wetness index of 696.12 and is about 16% forested.

See also
List of Delaware rivers

References

Rivers of Delaware
Rivers of Sussex County, Delaware
Tributaries of the Nanticoke River